Gordineşti may refer to several places in Moldova:

 Gordineşti, a commune in Edineţ district
 Gordineşti, a commune in Rezina district